James Leche (by 1518 – 1553 or 1554) of Newtown, Montgomeryshire, was a Welsh politician.

He was a Member (MP) of the Parliament of England for Montgomeryshire in 1542.

References

1554 deaths
16th-century Welsh politicians
Members of the Parliament of England (pre-1707) for constituencies in Wales
People from Newtown, Powys
English MPs 1542–1544
Year of birth uncertain